Goniurellia omissa is a species of tephritid or fruit flies in the genus Goniurellia of the family Tephritidae.

Distribution
South Africa.

References

Tephritinae
Insects described in 1980
Diptera of Africa